Events from the year 1383 in Ireland.

Incumbent
Lord: Richard II

Events
Ralph Cheyne, appointed Lord Chancellor of Ireland

Births

Deaths

 
1380s in Ireland
Ireland
Years of the 14th century in Ireland